Marco Bui (born 17 October 1977) is an Italian professional mountain biker. Bui won the 2001 UCI Mountain Bike World Cup in the Cross-country time-trial.  During that season he recorded two wins - one at Napa Valley and one at Houffalize.

Bui also represented Italy at the Olympics.

References

1977 births
Living people
Italian male cyclists
Italian mountain bikers
Cross-country mountain bikers
Cyclists at the 2000 Summer Olympics
Cyclists at the 2004 Summer Olympics
Olympic cyclists of Italy
Sportspeople from Venice
People from Mestre-Carpenedo
Cyclists from the Metropolitan City of Venice